Karl Berggren from the Massachusetts Institute of Technology, Cambridge, MA was named Fellow of the Institute of Electrical and Electronics Engineers (IEEE) in 2016 for contributions to nanofabrication and nanomanufacturing in the sub-10 nm regime.

References

Fellow Members of the IEEE
Living people
Year of birth missing (living people)
Place of birth missing (living people)
Massachusetts Institute of Technology faculty
American electrical engineers